The 1956 Tennessee Volunteers football team (variously Tennessee, UT, or the Vols) represented the University of Tennessee in the 1956 NCAA University Division football season. Playing as a member of the Southeastern Conference (SEC), the team was led by head coach Bowden Wyatt, in his second year, and played their home games at Shields–Watkins Field in Knoxville, Tennessee. They finished the season with a record of ten wins and one loss (10–1 overall, 6–0 in the SEC), as SEC Champions and with a loss against Baylor in the Sugar Bowl. The Volunteers offense scored 275 points while the defense allowed 88 points.

Schedule

Roster
HB #45 Johnny Majors, Sr.

Team players drafted into the NFL

References

Tennessee
Tennessee Volunteers football seasons
Southeastern Conference football champion seasons
Tennessee Volunteers football